NA-2 Swat-I is a constituency for the National Assembly of Pakistan. The constituency was known as  NA-30 (Swat-II) from 2002 to 2018, the name was changed to NA-2 (Swat-I) after the delimitation in 2018 and tehsil Matta was carved out of it to create NA-4 (Swat-III); it was merged with tehsil Kabal to form the constituency.

Members of Parliament

1977–2002: NA-30 (Swat-II)

2002–2018: NA-30 (Swat-II)

Since 2018: NA-2 (Swat-I)

Election 2002

General Elections were held on 10 October 2002. Fazal-e-Subhan won this seat with 67,085 votes.

Election 2008

General Elections were held on 18 February 2008. Syed Allaudinn won this seat with 24,063 votes.

Election 2013

General Elections were held on 11 May 2013. Salim Rehman from Pakistan Tehreek-e-Insaf won this seat with 49,976 votes.

Election 2018

General elections were held on 25 July 2018. Pakistan Tehreek-e-Insaf's candidate Haider Ali Khan win the election from NA-2 Swat by securing 61,687 votes while Amir Muqam from Pakistan Muslim League (N) obtained 41,125 votes.

†JI and JUI-F contested as part of MMA

By-election 2023 
A by-election will be held on 19 March 2023 due to the resignation of Haider Ali Khan, the previous MNA from this seat.

See also
NA-1 Upper Chitral-cum-Lower Chitral
NA-3 Swat-II

References

External links 
NA 2 Swat General Election 2018 Result
Election result's official website

2
2